Peter Lamont (1929–2020) was a British film-set decorator.

Peter Lamont may also refer to:

Peter Lamont (historian)
Peter Lamont (footballer)
Peter Lamont, current Chief of Clan Lamont